Rationale may refer to:
 
 An explanation of the basis or fundamental reasons for something
 Design rationale, an explicit documentation of the reasons behind design decisions
 Rationale (vestment), a liturgical vestment worn by some Roman Catholic bishops
 Rationale (musician) (born 1984), Zimbabwean-born British singer and songwriter
 Rationale (album), 2017

See also
Rationality
Rational (disambiguation)
Rationalism (disambiguation)
Rationalization (disambiguation)